Nowe Gałki  is a village in the administrative district of Gmina Mała Wieś, within Płock County, Masovian Voivodeship, in east-central Poland.

The village has an approximate population of 320.

References

Villages in Płock County